Pavel Vladimirovich Potapovich (born 26 November 1980 in Peresady, Minsk Region) is a Russian track and field athlete who mainly competes in the 3000 metres steeplechase.

International competitions

External links 

1980 births
Living people
Russian male middle-distance runners
Russian male steeplechase runners
Olympic athletes of Russia
Athletes (track and field) at the 2004 Summer Olympics
Athletes (track and field) at the 2008 Summer Olympics
World Athletics Championships athletes for Russia
Sportspeople from Minsk Region